Mount Mitchell is a mountain located within the Sunwapta River valley of Jasper National Park, Canada,  southeast of Mount Morden Long.

Mt. Mitchell was named in 1970 for J.H. Mitchell and Mitchell Lobb, who were engineers for the Department of the Interior. Mitchell oversaw the construction of the Icefields Parkway from Jasper to the Banff-Jasper boundary.

References

Three-thousanders of Alberta
Winston Churchill Range
Mountains of Jasper National Park